CKU may refer to:
 Chiba Keizai University, a private university in Inage-ku, Chiba, Japan
 Cordova Municipal Airport, the IATA and FAA LID code CKU
 ISO 639:cku, the ISO 639 code for the Koasati language